Obersaxen Mundaun is a municipality in the Surselva Region in the Swiss canton of Graubünden.  On 1 January 2016 the former municipalities of Obersaxen and Mundaun merged to form the new municipality of Obersaxen Mundaun.

History

Obersaxen
The Obersaxen plateau first appears in historic records in 765, as Supersaxa, when Bishop Tello gave his farms and meadows there to Disentis Abbey.  In 806 it became an Imperial Estate, which it remained until 956 when Emperor Otto I donated Supersaxa village and the village church back to the Bishop of Chur.  In 1227 it was mentioned as Ubersahse.

The current settlement was founded in the thirteenth century, when a group of German-speaking Walser settled the plateau. Right in the heart of the mainly Romansh-speaking Surselva (which encompasses the valley of the Vorderrhein, along with all of its side valleys, among others the Val Lumnezia), Obersaxen is an island of German-speakers.

Mundaun
Mundaun was formed on 1 January 2009 through the merger of Flond and Surcuolm.

Geography
 
Of this area, about 53.4% is used for agricultural purposes, while 24.9% is forested. Of the rest of the land, 2.4% is settled (buildings or roads) and 19.4% is unproductive land. Of the agricultural land,  is fields and grasslands and  consists of alpine grazing areas. Rivers and lakes cover  in the municipality.

The new municipality is located in the Lugnez sub-district of the Surselva district, after 2017 it was part of the Surselva Region.  It is located on the northern face of the Mundaun mountain chain and the Obersaxen high plateau south of the Vorderrhein river.  It consists of a number of widely scattered settlements throughout the municipal area.

Demographics
Obersaxen Mundaun has a population (as of ) of

Historic Population
The historical population of Obersaxen and the two former municipalities that made up Mundaun, Flond and Surcuolm, is given in the following chart:

References

External links

 
 
 

 
Ski areas and resorts in Switzerland
Municipalities of Graubünden